Zapadnaya Maygashlya (Könbayış Mäygäşle) is a rural locality (a village) in Tukansky Selsoviet, Beloretsky District, Bashkortostan, Russia. The population was 1 as of 2010. There is 1 street.

Geography 
Zapadnaya Maygashlya is located 92 km southwest of Beloretsk (the district's administrative centre) by road. Tara is the nearest rural locality.

References 

Rural localities in Beloretsky District